Marshall's Miracle, also known as
Marshall the Miracle Dog is a 2015 American family drama film directed by Jay Kanzler and co-written with Scott Zakarin. The film stars Shannon Elizabeth, Lauren Holly, Matthew Settle, Bill Chott and Lucas McHugh Carroll.

The inspirational film about Marshall, a dog who was rescued by the Humane Society of Missouri from an abandoned property with over 60 dogs living there. Marshall had been badly injured and left for dead by the other dogs, he was rescued and taken care and then Cyndi Willenbrock ended up adopting Marshall a few months later.

Principal photography began on June 2, 2014, in Edwardsville, Illinois. Shooting also took place in Metro East, Troy, Il., and St. Louis, Missouri.

Plot 
A young boy named Finn rescues an injured dog from an abandoned property in St. Louis.  12-year-old Finn (Lucas Carroll) endures daily torment from the bullies at his school, but his life begins to change the day that he encounters a Labrador retriever named Marshall. When Finn first finds the dog, Marshall is being held in deplorable conditions by an animal hoarder who keeps 60 dogs penned up on her isolated ranch. The boy sees something of himself in Marshall: Both are bullied, but both are brave. By saving Marshall from the dogs that are attacking him, Finn pulls off a daring rescue—and that’s only the beginning of the story. Inspired by a true story, “Marshall the Miracle Dog” stars Shannon Elizabeth, Lauren Holly, and Matthew Settle.

Cast 
 Shannon Elizabeth as Cynthia Willenbrock
 Lauren Holly as Susan
 Matthew Settle as Doc Henry
 Bill Chott as Gary
 Lucas McHugh Carroll as Finn

Production 
In April 2014, it was announced that a film based on the book Marshall the Miracle Dog written by Cyndi Willenbrock will be made, Jay Kanzler would direct the film.

Filming 
The principal photography on the film began on June 2, 2014, in Edwardsville, Illinois. On June 12, the filming began at Tri-Township Park in Troy, which lasted for a week. Metro East was also used as one of the filming locations in Troy. Filming ended in Edwardsville on June 19, 2014, and then the production moved to St. Louis, Missouri for a couple of scenes. Filming was completed by the end of June.

Release
The film was released on August 28, 2015.

References

External links 
 
 
 

2015 films
Drama films based on actual events
Films about dogs
Films about animal rights
Films about animals
Films shot in Illinois
Films shot in Missouri
Films set in St. Louis
American drama films
2015 drama films
2010s English-language films
2010s American films